Lithuania competed at the 2007 World Aquatics Championships in Melbourne, Australia.

Swimming

8 swimmers represented Lithuania:

Men

References

Nations at the 2007 World Aquatics Championships
2007 in Lithuanian sport
Lithuania at the World Aquatics Championships